Carol Elizabeth Howe is a former informant for the Bureau of Alcohol, Tobacco, Firearms and Explosives (ATF). Howe became a key figure in Oklahoma City bombing conspiracy theories when she said that she informed authorities of a right-wing extremist plan to blow up a federal building in Oklahoma a few months before the Oklahoma City bombing.

Early life
Howe was adopted at birth by a wealthy family in Tulsa, Oklahoma. 
Her father, Bob Howe, was a former CEO of Mapco Incorporated, a Tulsa energy conglomerate. Her mother, Aubyn Howe, worked as a philanthropist. The family were members of Southern Hills Country Club.

After graduating from Tulsa Metro Christian Academy as an honor student, she lived in several places in the early 1990s, either taking college classes or working a variety of "non-career" type jobs.

Fall-in with the radical right  
According to White Aryan Resistance member Dennis Mahon, Howe wrote to him in 1993 with an alleged interest in joining his group. Howe says she became involved with white supremacists in 1994 after allegedly being injured by a group of African-American men. According to Howe's lawyer, she then called Dial-A-Racist, a local hotline operated by Mahon.

During her time as a white-separatist, she obtained a swastika tattoo on her shoulder and an iron cross on her leg.

Time at Elohim City
In 1994, Mahon began taking 24-year-old Howe to the white-separatist enclave in Elohim City, Oklahoma. While living on the compound for some months, she appeared on German television with Mahon to advocate violence as a means to reach the goal of a racially pure, white society.

According to Robert Millar, the founder and spiritual leader of Elohim City, Howe stayed there approximately six weeks before the Oklahoma City bombing. Her relationship with Dennis Mahon had ended after he had apparently raped her, prompting Howe to flee to her grandfather's ranch in Texas.

In August 1994, Howe filed a restraining order against Mahon. This attracted the attention of the ATF, who were already investigating Mahon's radical paramilitary group, W.A.R., for suspected violation of federal firearms and conspiracy laws.

Carol Howe was then employed by the Bureau as a confidential informant. She was sent to Elohim City for the purpose of gathering intel related to their investigation.

Before the Oklahoma City Bombing
From August 1994 through March 1995, Howe served as an ATF informant going by the code number CI-183. She was paid $120 a week to monitor the Elohim City compound and wrote monthly reports to her ATF handler, Agent Angela "Angie" Finley-Graham.

Carol Howe described the residents of Elohim City as ultra-militant white separatists with anti-government beliefs. She noted that the community had been sympathetic towards David Koresh, even having a Branch Davidian flag hanging in their church.

Howe says she informed her agency handlers, prior to April 19, 1995, that various Elohim City residents were planning an attack on Federal Buildings, which included the Alfred P. Murrah Federal Building in Oklahoma City.

Agency officials claim that Howe was deactivated because of mental instability. Finely-Graham states that Howe was reinstated in the aftermath of the Oklahoma City bombing, but did no informant work after June 1995.

Post-OKC Bombing
After the Oklahoma City bombing had occurred, Carol Howe was instructed by the Bureau of Alcohol Tobacco and Firearms to return to Elohim City compound in order to obtain information regarding any possible connection between the residents of the community and the bombing. Starting on May 1 of 1995, she stayed on the compound for a total of three days before returning to her ATF handler to report her findings.

On May 18, 1995, Howe was apparently banned from entering Elohim City by Robert Millar due to speculation that she had been a government informant.

Testimony
Howe was present at the Terry Nichols trial, where she testified that she saw Timothy McVeigh in Elohim City in July 1994 with Andreas Carl Strassmeir and Peter Ward. She also identified John Does #1 and #2 as brothers Pete and Tony Ward, both residents of the compound. She said that in the days following the bombing, ATF agents showed her a videotape of McVeigh, and she told the agents she had seen McVeigh at a Ku Klux Klan rally.

Judge Richard P. Matsch refused to allow Howe's testimony in Timothy McVeigh's trial in the Oklahoma City bombing case.

National Socialist Alliance of Oklahoma

Sometime after the bombing, Howe (using the name "Freya"), along with her then-fiancée, James Dodson Viefhaus Jr., formed a white supremacy organization in Tulsa, known as the National Socialist Alliance of Oklahoma, of which they were the only members. The group advocated the destruction of blacks, Jews, homosexuals and federal law enforcement agents.

The alliance operated an Aryan Intelligence Network hotline on which Viefhaus had recorded a message sometime in December 1996 where he made a bomb threat. His message demanded so-called "white warriors" to take action against the U.S. Government and that failure to do so before December 15 (of that year) would result in bombs going off in 15 U.S. cities. Despite this, no bombs detonated. Viefhaus was arrested soon after he recorded this message in an answering machine at the Tulsa house he shared with Howe.

On December 13, 1996, a search warrant was executed at the house the two shared. During a raid by federal agents, various items were found, which, according to FBI bomb expert Robert Heckman, could have been assembled into a pipe bomb with lethal potential. In addition to bomb ingredients, federal agents found several guns, books on how to construct weapons, and lists of alleged targets. Also found in the house was a picture of the couple, holding weapons and wearing swastikas on their clothing.

Trial
Howe had not been charged previously in connection with the December raid on the home, but at a hearing for Viefhaus, prosecutors had said they considered her "almost an equal threat". Howe says that she had set up the white supremacist hot line in 1996 to enhance her cover after federal agents disclosed her identity. During her trial, she explained to the jury that her life as a white separatist was only done as a pose to gather information as an undercover Government informer. She also testified that the capped pipe, black powder and length of fuse recovered from the home she shared with Viefhaus had been gathered during her work as an informant for the Bureau of Alcohol, Tobacco and Firearms.

Viefhaus was convicted of transmitting a bomb threat by a telephone answering machine and conspiracy to transmit the threat and was sentenced to 38 months in prison for conspiracy, making a bomb threat and possessing the components of a destructive device. Howe was found not guilty in a separate trial.

Later
Howe has since changed her name and is the subject of a Columbia Pictures movie project.

References 

Police informants
American whistleblowers
People from Tulsa, Oklahoma
American adoptees
Year of birth missing (living people)
Living people
People who entered the United States Federal Witness Protection Program
Oklahoma City bombing
American debutantes
American white supremacists
21st-century American women